The 1892–93 season was Stoke's fourth season in the Football League.

Stoke finally made an improvement in the Football League finishing in 7th position with 29 points. Stoke fielded a settled side all season as just sixteen players were used with five of them playing in every match.

Season review

League
In 1892–93 Stoke finally made an impression in the Football League and claimed seventh place in the table. They collected 29 points, 11 more than bottom club Newton Heath, but were 19 points behind champions Sunderland. Ted Evans became the first Stoke player to be sent-off in the league when he received his marching orders in an away match at Everton on 12 November 1892, Stoke held out for a 2–2 draw. Throughout the season manager Arthur Reeves was able to field a settled side which included successful Scottish imports Davy Christie, Davy Brodie, Billy Dickson, Willie Naughton and Jimmie Robertson. Stoke went on an eight match unbeaten run through October and November and back to back home 7–1 and 6–0 victories over Newton Heath and Bolton Wanderers respectively the best results in an encouraging campaign for the "Potters".

FA Cup
There was no joy in the cup as Stoke lost 2–1 to Accrington in the first round. It proved to be the final meeting between the sides as Accrington resigned from the league at the end of the season.

Final league table

Results

Stoke's score comes first

Legend

Football League First Division

FA Cup

Squad statistics

References

Stoke City F.C. seasons
Stoke